Olivio may refer to:

 Olivio (restaurant), Dutch Michelin starred restaurant

People
 Olívio Dutra (born 1941), Brazilian politician
 Olívio Aurélio Fazza (1925–2008), Brazilian Bishop of the Roman Catholic Church
 Olivio da Rosa (born 1985), Brazilian footballer
 Olivio Sòzzi (1696–1765), Italian painter during the Rococo period